Donald Cameron Easterbrook Gorrie OBE (2 April 1933 – 25 August 2012) was a Scottish Liberal Democrat politician.  He was a Member of the Scottish Parliament (MSP) for the Central Scotland region from 1999 to 2007. He also sat in the British House of Commons from 1997 to 2001 as the Member of Parliament (MP) for Edinburgh West.

Personal life
Gorrie was educated at the independent Oundle School and Corpus Christi College, Oxford, where he read classics and modern history. A former athlete, he held the Scottish record for the 880 yards in his youth. He won the 880 yards and mile run at the 1957 Canadian Track and Field Championships. He was married to Astrid and had two sons and a number of grandchildren.

His son Robert Gorrie was a Liberal Democrat councillor in Haringey, London, 2006–2014 and was Leader of the Opposition 2008–2011. He also stood for the Scottish Parliament seat of Airdrie and Shotts in the 2007 Scottish Parliament election.

Early career
After starting his professional career as a schoolteacher, he was Secretary of the Scottish Liberal Party, before becoming an Edinburgh City councillor in 1971. He remained a member of Edinburgh Council until its dissolution in 1976, when he became a member of Lothian Regional Council 1976–96, Edinburgh District Council 1978–96 and the new Edinburgh City Council 1995–97. During this time he stood for election to Westminster in the Edinburgh West constituency four times before finally winning it and becoming the area's MP in 1997.

Scottish Parliament
But his lifelong passion in politics was to see the establishment of a Scottish Parliament, and sit as a Member of it. So when the Scottish Parliament was established by the referendum of 1997, he announced he would retire from Westminster after just one term as an MP to stand for the new Scottish Parliament. He was therefore elected in 1999, as Liberal Democrat MSP for the Central Scotland region (retiring from Westminster at the next General Election in 2001).

Opponents
A feisty and independent-minded politician, he was always fiercely loyal to his liberal instincts, and had a particular mistrust of the Labour Party, which he saw as centralist and corrupt. He was firmly on the radical left of the Liberal Democrats, believing in full-scale political reform and significant increases in spending on public services. This put him at odds with the more cautious party leadership at the time, and he was often seen as a renegade member of the 'awkward squad,' for example in his implacable opposition to the coalition with the Labour Party formed after the 1999 elections (he was one of only three of his party's MSPs to vote against it).

Gorrie disliked his characterisation as a rebel, pointing to the fact that (unlike the pro-coalition MSPs) he was merely sticking to the Liberal Democrats' manifesto commitments.

Second term
As time passed, and particularly after he was re-elected for a second term as MSP in 2003, he mellowed, however, and – confined to the backbenches with no hope of ministerial appointment – he concentrated on campaigning on a number of particular themes which interested him. His boldness and eye for publicity endeared him to a media corps that was often starved of stories by the cautious and tightly-controlled party machines that operated at Holyrood, and he became associated with a number of individual causes, like the spiralling cost and mismanagement of the Holyrood building project, and later his campaign against the sectarianism that plagued Scottish society. Though controversial at first, this latter campaign raised the profile of the issue until eventually it was taken up by First Minister Jack McConnell, who instigated a series of legislative attempts to deal with the issue.

Disliked by some (mainly those in what he would term 'the establishment') for the uncompromising stances he has taken, Donald Gorrie is nevertheless widely respected for his consistency of principle and his long record of service to liberal politics and public life in general. He retired from the Scottish Parliament at the 2007 elections. He upset the party leadership during the campaign by saying the Lib Dems should 'never say never' to an independence referendum – as that would resign them to another coalition with the Labour Party.

References

External links 
 
 

1933 births
2012 deaths
Councillors in Edinburgh
Scottish Liberal Democrat MPs
Liberal Democrat MSPs
Members of the Parliament of the United Kingdom for Scottish constituencies
Members of the Parliament of the United Kingdom for Edinburgh constituencies
Officers of the Order of the British Empire
Scottish schoolteachers
UK MPs 1997–2001
Elders of the Church of Scotland
Place of birth missing
Members of the Scottish Parliament 1999–2003
Members of the Scottish Parliament 2003–2007
Scottish Liberal Party councillors
Scottish Liberal Democrat councillors
Scottish male middle-distance runners
British male middle-distance runners
People educated at Oundle School